Chaetocladius is a genus of non-biting midges in the subfamily Orthocladiinae of the bloodworm family (Chironomidae).

Species
C. subplumosus (Kieffer 1923)
C. acuminatus Brundin 1956
C. acuticornis (Kieffer 1914)
C. algericus Moubayed 1989
C. binotatus (Lundström 1915)
C. brittae Säwedal 1976
C. crassisaetosus Tuiskunen 1986
C. dentiforceps (Edwards 1929)
C. dissipatus (Edwards 1929)
C. gelidus Brundin 1956
C. glacialis (Lundström 1915)
C. gracilis Brundin 1956
C. grandilobus Brundin 1956
C. holmgreni (Jacobson 1898)
C. insolitus Caspers 1987
C. laminatus Brundin 1947
C. maeaeri Brundin 1947
C. melaleucus (Meigen, 1818)
C. minutissimus Goetghebuer 1942
C. muliebris Tuiskunen 1986
C. perennis (Meigen, 1830)
C. piger (Goetghebuer 1913)
C. rusticus (Goetghebuer 1932)
C. suecicus (Kieffer 1916)
C. tenuistylus Brundin 1947
C. vitellinus (Kieffer 1908)
C.franzjosephiensis (Krasheninnikov 2013)

References 

Chironomidae
Taxa named by Jean-Jacques Kieffer
Nematocera genera